Todarmal may refer to:

 Todar Mal (died 1589), Finance Minister of the Mughal empire
 Pandit Todarmal (1719–1766), Indian scholar and writer